Maricela Aurora Chávez Reyes (born 24 September 1962) is a retired racewalker from Mexico. She set her personal best in the women's 10 km race walk event (44:10 min) on 23 May 1993 in Brandýs.

Achievements

References

sports-reference

1962 births
Living people
Mexican female racewalkers
Athletes (track and field) at the 1991 Pan American Games
Athletes (track and field) at the 1992 Summer Olympics
Olympic athletes of Mexico
Pan American Games medalists in athletics (track and field)
Pan American Games bronze medalists for Mexico
Central American and Caribbean Games silver medalists for Mexico
Competitors at the 1990 Central American and Caribbean Games
Central American and Caribbean Games medalists in athletics
Medalists at the 1991 Pan American Games